Jardi may refer to:
 Jir Deh, Rudsar, a village in Iran
 Andrea Jardi (born 1990), Spanish skier

See also 
 Jardee